Foxrock–Cabinteely GAA is a Gaelic Athletic Association club based in the Foxrock, Cabinteely, Johnstown and Cornelscourt areas of Dún Laoghaire–Rathdown. The club was founded in 2005, following the merger of Foxrock Girls Gaelic Club and Cabinteely GAA. The club specialises in ladies' Gaelic football. During the 2010s Foxrock–Cabinteely have won both the Dublin Ladies' Senior Football Championship and the Leinster Ladies' Senior Club Football Championship. They have also played in All-Ireland Ladies' Club Football Championship finals.

History
In 2005 Cabinteely GAA Ladies' merged with Foxrock Girls Gaelic Club to become Foxrock–Cabinteely GAA.  The founding members of the club, including Pat Ring and Philip McAnenly, decided that the new club should specialise in ladies' Gaelic football. They also established partnerships with local national schools, including St. Patrick's and Hollypark in Foxrock, St. Brigid's in Cabinteely, Our Lady of Good Counsel in Johnstown and St. Anne's in Shankill. This saw Pat Ring coaching in the schools and actively recruiting players for the club.

In 2005 Foxrock–Cabinteely formed their first adult team in conjunction with Naomh Ólaf. In 2007 they won their first adult title when they won the Dublin Junior A Championship.  In the same year they also won an All-Ireland junior title. In 2008 they gained intermediate status and by 2009 they had obtained senior status. In 2012 they won the Dublin Ladies' Senior Football Championship for the first time. As of 2020, the club had over 500 playing members.

Senior finals

All-Ireland
In 2016 Foxrock–Cabinteely played in their first All-Ireland final but lost to Donaghmoyne. In 2018 they made a second appearance in the All-Ireland final but once again finished as runners-up, losing out to Mourneabbey.

Leinster

Dublin

Notes

Notable players

Senior inter-county ladies' footballers
 

 
 Fiona Claffey
 Meath
 Aedin Murray 
 Laois
 Laura Nerney
 
 Lorna Fusciardi

Honours
All-Ireland Ladies' Club Football Championship
Runner up: 2016, 2018: 2
Leinster Ladies' Senior Club Football Championship
Winners: 2015, 2016, 2017, 2018, 2019: 5
Runner up: 2012: 1
Dublin Ladies' Senior Football Championship
Winners: 2012, 2015, 2016, 2017, 2018, 2019, 2020: 7
Runner up: 2014: 1

References

External links
 Foxrock Cabinteely on Facebook
 Foxrock Cabinteely on Twitter

Ladies' Gaelic football teams
Ladies' Gaelic football in County Dublin
Gaelic football clubs in Dún Laoghaire–Rathdown
Gaelic games clubs in Dún Laoghaire–Rathdown
Gaelic Athletic Association clubs established in 2005
2005 establishments in Ireland